The Geriatric Depression Scale (GDS) is a 30-item self-report assessment used to identify depression in the elderly. The scale was first developed in 1982 by J.A. Yesavage and others.

Description
In the Geriatric Depression Scale, questions are answered "yes" or "no". A five-category response set is not utilized in order to ensure that the scale is simple enough to be used when testing ill or moderately cognitively impaired individuals, for whom a more complex set of answers may be confusing, or lead to inaccurate recording of responses.

The GDS is commonly used as a routine part of a comprehensive geriatric assessment. One point is assigned to each answer and the cumulative score is rated on a scoring grid. The grid sets a range of 0–9 as "normal", 10–19 as "mildly depressed", and 20–30 as "severely depressed".

A diagnosis of clinical depression should not be based on GDS results alone. Although the test has well-established reliability and validity evaluated against other diagnostic criteria, responses should be considered along with results from a comprehensive diagnostic work-up. A short version of the GDS (GDS-SF) containing 15 questions has been developed, and the scale is available in languages other than English. The conducted research found the GDS-SF to be an adequate substitute for the original 30-item scale.

The GDS was validated against Hamilton Rating Scale for Depression (HRS-D) and the Zung Self-Rating Depression Scale (SDS). It was found to have a 92% sensitivity and an 89% specificity when evaluated against diagnostic criteria.

Scale questions and scoring
The scale consists of 30 yes/no questions. Each question is scored as either 0 or 1 points. The following general cutoff may be used to qualify the severity: 
normal 0–9, 
mild depressives 10–19, 
severe depressives 20–30.

See also 
 Diagnostic classification and rating scales used in psychiatry

References

External links
Online version of the Geriatric Depression Scale
Stanford University web site on the Geriatric Depression Scale including translations

Depression screening and assessment tools
Geriatric psychiatry